Nanyang Huizhong (675-775 CE) was a Zen monk during the Tang Dynasty. He is often known by his nickname, National Teacher Zhong because he was the personal teacher of the Tang Emperors Suzong and Daizong. Huizhong was born in Zhuji, but left home at a young age to become a monk under a Vinaya teacher. Huzhong lived through the so-called "Zen Golden Age", during which many important developments took place, especially the fracturing of the East Mountain School into the Northern, Southern, and Sichuan schools.  However, the National Teacher avoided associating with any of the various factions.  Indeed, he is purported to have spent forty uninterrupted years practicing Zen on Baiya Mountain's Dangzi Valley in Nanyang before being summoned by Emperor Suzong in 761. However, he did hold a critical opinion of the Southern School's wholesale denial of sutra-study. He specifically criticized the teaching of Mazu Daoyi, a patriarch of the modern-day Rinzai school, that "Buddha is mind". He is featured in numerous koan collections, including the Blue Cliff Records, The Book of Equanimity, and the Gateless Gate.

Some of his teachings have also survived in Tangut versions found at Khara Khoto.

References

675 births
775 deaths
Tang dynasty Buddhists
Chinese Zen Buddhists
Chan Buddhists
Buddhist temples in Nanyang, Henan